PAS Giannina Football Club, or with its full name Panepirotikos Athlitikos Syllogos Giannina (Panepirotic Athletic Club Giannina) is a Greek professional football club based in the city of Ioannina, the capital of Epirus region.

PAS Giannina was formed in 1966 as a result of the union of the two local teams – AO Ioanninon (union of Atromitos Ioanninon and Olympiacos Ioanninon in 1962) and PAS Averof. As emblem of the new team was chosen the bull, as appeared on the ancient coin of the Epirote League. The club have competed several times in the Super League.

The club is probably best known among Greek football fans for its loyal support and its status as the most successful football club in Epirus region.

History

The beginning (1966–1971)
The first official match was for the Greek Cup against Pindos Konitsas on 2 October 1966. The result was 4–0 for PAS Giannina.

PAS Giannina was a mid-table club of the Second Division until 1971. In 1966–67, the club finished 6th. In 1967–68, it finished 10th. In 1968–69, it finished 5th. In 1969–70, it finished 7th. In 1970–71, it finished 13th.

The rise of "Ajax of Epirus" (1971–1983)
In 1971, the Portuguese Gómez de Faria was signed as manager. In 1971–72, PAS Giannina finished 13th. In the middle of the season, three Argentine players were signed: Alfredo Glasman, Jose Pasternac and Eduardos Kontogeorgakis (who is Eduardo Rigani's son). At the end of the season, three more Argentine players were signed: Juan Montes, Oscar Alvarez and Eduardo Lisa. PAS Giannina was in the race for promotion. In 1972–73, the club finished second. In 1973–74, it finished first and was promoted to the First division.

PAS Giannina was in the First Division for 10 years. The club finished several times near the top of the First Division table, often earning victories over more established Greek teams such as Olympiacos, Panathinaikos, AEK Athens and PAOK. The effective and spirited play of the club during these years drew flattering comparisons with the famous Dutch club Ajax Amsterdam, and the moniker "Ajax of Epirus" has stuck with the team ever since.

In 1974–75, PAS Giannina finished 9th. In 1975–76, PAS Giannina finished 5th for the first time. This position is the record high for the club. In 1976–77, it finished 11th. In 1977–78, the club finished 5th again. The club qualified for the Balkans Cup for the first time in its history. In 1978–79, it finished 14th. In 1979–80, it finished 6th. In the middle of the season, former Poland national team coach Jacek Gmoch was signed from the Epirote club. It was a brief but a reasonably successful tenure. In 1980–81, it finished 11th. In 1981–82, it finished 14th. In 1982–83, it finished 9th.

In the doldrums (1983–1997)
The period following the aforementioned peak years of the club generally marked a sharp decline in the fortunes of it as many of its top stars moved on or retired outright without being satisfactorily replaced. In 1983–84, PAS Giannina finished 15th. It was in a tie with Panionios. There was a play out match in Larissa between the two clubs. Panionios won the match 2–0. PAS Giannina relegated in the Second Division. In 1984–85, the club finished first in the Second Division and was promoted to the First Division. In 1985–86, it finished 13th. In 1986–87, it finished 16th and was relegated to the Second Division   In 1987–88, it finished 12th. In 1988–89, it finished 4th. The club qualified for the promotion playoffs with Ethnikos Piraeus, Apollon Kalamarias, Korinthos, Diagoras and Veroia. It failed to get promoted. In 1989–90, it finished third and got promoted to the First Division. In 1990–91, the club finished 18th and was relegated to the Second Division. In 1991–92, the club finished 14th. In 1992–93, it finished 10th. PAS Giannina qualified for the Balkans Cup for the second time in its history. In 1993–94, it finished 5th. Also the club was runner up in the Balkans Cup 1993–94. In 1994–95, it finished 8th. In 1995–96, it finished 12th. In 1996–97, it finished 16th. PAS Giannina was relegated to the Third Division for the first time in its history.

Comeback and a new crisis (1997–2004)
PAS Giannina was in the Third Division for the first time in its history. In 1997–98, it finished first and got promoted to the Second division. In 1998–99, it finished 4th, failing to get promoted to the First Division. In 1999–00, it finished third and qualified for the promotion playoffs with Egaleo and Panserraikos. PAS Giannina won Panserraikos 3–1 and draw with Egaleo 1–1. After that the club promoted to the First Division. In 2000–01, it finished 13th and qualified to the relegation playoffs. The club relegated after a 3-game playoff with OFI Crete. In 2001–02, PAS Giannina finished first and promoted to the First Division.

PAS experienced a fair degree of instability in these years. In 2002–03, PAS Giannina finished 14th. After the penalty of 90 points the club finished 16th and relegated. The penalty of 90 points imposed on it by the Greek football association (EPO) for financial reasons. There were a lot of financial problems in season 2003–04. The club finished 14th and qualified to playout with Ilisiakos. The club lost 3–1 and relegated in the Third division for the second time in its history. The club turned on a semi-professional status.

Semifinals Of Greek Cup (2004–2010)
 The control of the club switched over to attorney Alexis Kougias. In 2004–05, the club finished second and failed to get promoted. In 2005–06 it finished second and got promoted to Second Division. In 2006–07, PAS Giannina finished 5th. Also, PAS Giannina reached the semifinals of the Greek Cup 2006–07 against AE Larissa FC. PAS Giannina lost 2–0 both home and away match. On the quarter-final PAS Giannina won Olympiacos, 2–0 at home and lost 2–1 in Karaiskakis Stadium of an extra-time goal from Evangelos Kontogoulidis before a hostile crowd. PAS Giannina finished 4th in the Second Division in the 2007–08 season, failing to get promoted.

In the summer of 2008, ownership of the club was passed over to Giorgos Christovasilis, a businessman from Athens whose roots are from the Epirus region. He signed Guillermo Ángel Hoyos as manager and some great players such as Luciano. In the 2008–09 season, the club promoted as second in the Super League.

In the summer of 2009, the club signed players such as Dimitrios Eleftheropoulos, Ibrahima Bakayoko, Konstantinos Mendrinos, Ilias Kotsios. In 2009–10, the club finished 15th and got relegated one more time. On the other hand, the club was successful in the Greek Cup. PAS Giannina reached the semifinals for the second time in its history. In the quarter final PAS Giannina won PAOK 4–0 in Zosimades Stadium. In the semifinals, the club lost from Panathinaikos on aggregate 2–4.

Road to UEFA Europa League (2010–2017) 
 In the 2010–11 season, PAS Giannina was promoted as second again to Super League. The club takes part in Super League every year. In 2011–12, PAS Giannina finished 8th. In 2012–13, PAS Giannina finished 5th and qualified for the playoffs with Atromitos, Asteras Tripolis and PAOK for the first time in its history.Also, Giannis Christopoulos won the best manager of the year award.

It started with 2 wins but at the end it finished 4th. The club qualified for Europa League. PAS Giannina were not licensed to play in the Europa League and therefore were replaced by the next Europa League licensed team in the table, not already qualified for any European competition, which was Skoda Xanthi. In 2013–14, the club finished 11th, a safe mid-table position. In 2014–15, the club finished 6th. Also that year, there were awards for the manager and two players. Giannis Petrakis won the best manager of the year award. Charis Charisis won the best young player of Greek Super League award and Markos Vellidis won the best goalkeeper award.

In 2015–16, the club finished 6th again. PAS Giannina qualified for UEFA Europa League 2016–17 because Panionios was excluded from participating in the 2016–17 European competitions by UEFA for financial reasons. The club qualified for European competitions, except Balkans Cup, for the first time in its history.

In 2016–17, the club takes part in the Super League. The club finished 9th. An important moment was the charity match for the refugees between the veterans of the club and FC Barcelona. The charity match and activities were organized by the Barça Players Association in collaboration with the United Nations High Commissioner for Refugees (UNHCR) and with the support of PAS Giannina FC.

Relegation and rebuild from scratch (2017–2022)
In 2017–18, the club finished 9th again in the Super League. Also, PAS Giannina reached the quarterfinals in the Greek Cup.

In 2018–19, after an awful season, PAS Giannina finished 14th and relegated to the Super League 2. There were many changes at the club. Petrakis left the club after years and a new manager, Argiris Giannikis was hired. Some players, with many years at the club, left it as well. Michail, Tzimopoulos, Lila, Giakos left the club. Some young players like Liasos, Lolis, Naumets took part at first 11. Also, Giorgos Dasios returned to the club as Director of Football. PAS Giannina was first when the championship was suspended. On 22 June 2020, it was announced that the ranking on 12 March 2020 is the final ranking. PAS Giannina won the Super League Greece 2 in the season 2019–20 and been the first team to win the new competition and the club was promoted to Super League 1.

In 2020-21,the club finished 8th on the regular season. It finished 9th after the end of play out. The team got into the semi-final of the Greek Cup in the season 2020-21 after beating Atromitos and Panathinaikos. PAS Giannina reached semi finals for the third time in its history. In the semifinals, the club lost from Olympiacos on aggregate 2–4, the only team considered capable to beat the in-form PAS Giannina side at the time by the Greek fans, many of whom considered the Epirus side the favorite to win in the final against either AEK or PAOK if qualified. The team consisted mainly of debutant players who were performing at their best such as Alexandros Kartalis, Christos Eleftheriadis, Nicolae Milinceanu etc.

Legendary 2021–2022 season and change of playing style

In the 2021–22 season, the club got 6th place in Super League Greece. In 2021-22 PAS Giannina finished 6th on the regular season and took part on play off round, finishing 6th,as well. This was one of the clubs most successful campaigns mostly due to the defensive style of play used by the coach Iraklis Metaxas, using the containing 4-4-2 double six formation. Rock solid defence was a result of great chemistry, athleticism, leadership, playing abilities and great passion from the goalkeeper, Yuri Lodygin who is regarded as the best goalkeeper to ever play for the Epirus side, and the defenders Peersman, Erramuspe, Kargas and Saliakas. Lodygin provided defensive security and stability, Erramuspe and Kargas displayed great leadership, fighting spirit, great aerial ability, and great ball playing skills, and with Peersman and Saliakas being two of the most consistent players throughout the whole season not only helped the team with their attacking runs, but were rock-solid on defence. On the midfield, PAS Giannina signing from Super League 2 club Levadiakos, Zisis Karachalios completed one of the best seasons of his career, alongside Domínguez for the first half of the season, and Caleb Stanko for the second half. Karachalios provided great support in defence, helping the team with his very high work rate, stamina, strength, interceptions and steals, being ranked as the player with the most steals in Super League 1. Perea made a great season scoring 10 goals helping PAS Giannina on attack.

A historic match between PAS Giannina Veterans and Ajax Veterans took part on Zosimades Stadium, on July 6, 2022.

European competitions record 

During the 2016–17 season, PAS Giannina competed on the UEFA Europa League qualifying rounds for the first time in the club's history. PAS Giannina finished 6th on the 2015–16 Super League Greece, which enabled him to participate, on the Second qualifying round.

PAS Giannina first european game

On the 21st of July 2016, PAS Giannina faced Odds BK in a full Zosimades Stadium with a total attendance of 5.615 spectators, who completed a pre game parade towards the stadium, with thousands of fans and hooligans loudly signing chants. Players were greeted into the stadium by an unprecedented atmosphere which could be heard throughout the whole locality.

PAS Giannina captain Alexios Michail opened the score from inside the box after a corner kick taken by Noé Acosta on the 7th minute. PAS Giannina had total control of the game, and in the 31st minute Fonsi Nadales doubled his team lead with a great volley after a perfectly executed cross by Nikos Karanikas. On the second half, the goalkeeper Alexandros Paschalakis with a presice volley across the whole length of the pitch, spotted Dimitrios Ferfelis who took advantage of the opposition's defenders error and sprinted towards goal with Acosta trailing. Ferfelis' shot got blockeded by the goalkeeper, who couldn't handle the ball, and got served for Noé Acosta who scored to form the final score.

On the 2nd leg, about 500 PAS Giannina fans traveled to Norway to support their team. The away side managed to concede no goals on the first half, but conceded 3 goals on the second half, and the game was led to extra time. However, the Epirus side managed to score after a remarkable dribble fooling the opposition defenders from Christopher Maboulou†, who let the ball pass beside him after a pass from Karanikas, to reach Leonardo Koutris who beat the goalkeeper, and formed the final score of 3-1 after extra time, and eventually led PAS Giannina to the Third qualifying round for the first time in the club's history.

Balkans Cup

Stadium and facilities

PAS Giannina play in the home ground, Zosimades, where they have played since its foundation. The capacity is 7,500 seats. The stadium is in the downtown of Ioannina. The highest attendance (14,557 fans) was in a match with Olympiacos in season 1974–75.

Zosimades is a very historic and legendary stadium, and is decorated from the outside with many graffities depicting club legends, and former squads, combined with old buildings around the stadium with a great variety of graffities, a very good and atmospheric scenery is made. The identity of the club is highly intense throughout the hole stamium, making PAS Giannina one of the most difficult and challenging opponents for everyone to beat.

The training facilities are in PEAKI. There are three football fields and a car parking with capacity of 500 cars.

Honours and distinctions

Over the years, PAS has competed in the Super League for a total of 26 seasons (plus 2021–22) The club has never won the Super League or the Greek Cup, but it has won lower division titles throughout its history and represented Greece in the 1979–80 and 1993–94 Balkans Cup tournaments. During its history in the Super League, the club finished 3 times in the 5th position (1975–76, 1977–78, 2012–13 seasons) and 4 times in the 6th position (1979–80, 2014–15, 2015–16, 2021–22 seasons).

On January 31, 2007, PAS clinched a spot in the Greek Cup semifinals by virtue of an extra-time goal from Evangelos Kontogoulidis before a hostile crowd in Karaiskakis Stadium. With an aggregate score of 3–2, PAS Giannina also is the first ever lower division club that eliminated Olympiacos from the Greek Cup tournament.

The most famous player to have donned the blue and white PAS Giannina's jersey in recent years is defender Giourkas Seitaridis, who later played for Panathinaikos, FC Porto, Dynamo Moscow, and Atlético Madrid as well as the triumphant Euro 2004 Greece squad.

Domestic competitions
Super League (First Division)
 1975–76, 5th place: 30 games, 36 points, 15 wins, 6 draws, 9 defeats, goals 40–33
 1977–78, 5th place: 34 games, 38 points, 14 wins, 10 draws, 10 defeats, goals 45–39
 1979–80, 6th place: 34 games, 37 points, 14 wins, 9 draws, 11 defeats, goals 50–44
 2012–13, 5th place: 30 games, 44 points, 12 wins, 8 draws, 10 defeats, goals 28–24
 2014–15, 6th place: 34 games, 53 points, 13 wins, 14 draws, 7 defeats, goals 47–33
 2015–16, 6th place: 30 games, 42 points, 12 wins, 6 draws, 12 defeats, goals 36–40
 2021–22, 6th place: 36 games, 46 points, 12 wins, 10 draws, 14 defeats, goals 34–42
Super League 2 (Second Division)
 Champions (4): 1973–74, 1984–85, 2001–02, 2019–20
Gamma Ethniki (Third Division)
 Champions (1): 1997–98
Greek Cup
 Semi-Finals (3): 2006–07, 2009–10, 2020–21

International
'Balkans Cup Runners-Up (1): 1993–94

Individual player and coach awardsBest Manager in Greece Giannis Christopoulos: 2012–13
 Giannis Petrakis: 2014–15Best Young Player Charis Charisis: 2014–15Best Goalkeeper Markos Vellidis: 2014–15
 Yuri Lodygin: 2021–22Top Scorer of Greek Cup Georgios Pamlidis: 2019–20 (together with Dimitris Pelkas)
 Pedro Conde: 2017–18 (together with Aleksandar Prijović, Lazaros Christodoulopoulos)
 Georgios Saitiotis: 2006–07 (together with Jozef Kožlej)Top Scorer of Beta Ethniki Ibrahima Bakayoko: 2010–11Super League Team of the Year Markos Vellidis: 2014–15
 Leonardo Koutris: 2016–17
 Yuri Lodygin: 2021–22
 Giannis Kargas: 2021–22
 Manolis Saliakas: 2021–22

Supporters and nickname
The team is well known for its passionate supporters, mainly from the city of Ioannina and the whole Epirus region. The first union was the fan club of square at 70s and 80s. A new fan club was founded on 1986. The name was the bulls (tavroi). The club was active until 2011. One more fan club was founded in the middle of 90s unofficial, Blue Vayeros. Officially it was founded on 2000. Apei rotan was founded on 2008 and they were active until 2015. Azzurra Familia was founded on 2013 and it was active for a short period. PAS Giannina fan club was founded on 2018.

There were fan clubs in Athens like Los Toros Locos (2001-2009) or Thessaloniki (Blue Vayeros Salonica (2006-2011). There are also groups in Greece or abroad.

PAS Giannina was given the nickname Ajax of Epirus (Greek: Άγιαξ της Ηπείρου) in the 1970s, thanks to their impressive football style which was linked licentia poetica to the style of the famous Dutch club.

Rivalries
PAS Giannina fans feel deep antipathy towards the clubs from Athens: Olympiacos, Panathinaikos and AEK Athens.

There is a rivalry with OFI Crete based on the events surrounding their 2001 playoffs. In contrast, derby matches against AE Larissa FC are competitive in the sporting sense but do not evoke the same feelings of enmity from PAS Giannina supporters. The other important rivals are Panachaiki, Panetolikos, AO Kerkyra.

In the past there were local derbies in Epirus. These were with Anagennisi Artas and PAS Preveza.

There was a rivalry with Panionios based on 1984 playout match. This rivalry has been increased since the summer of 2016, when Panionios was not granted a license by UEFA to compete in the Europa League following a claim by PAS Giannina. UEFA ruled that PAS Giannina take Panionios’ place in the 2016 2nd qualifying round of the Europa League.

Crest and colours
The colours of the team are blue or cyan and white. The crest depicts an ancient bull with an oak wreath, as appeared in an ancient coin (238–168 BC) of the Epirote League plus the word "ΑΠΕΙΡΩΤΑΝ" meaning "people of Epirus".

Players

Current squad

Out on loan

 Notable former players 

Albania
 Arben Arbëri
 Emiliano Barka
 Arjan Bellaj
 Agustin Kola
 Andi Lila 
 Leonid Mina
 Arben Muskaj
 Ledio Pano
 Simo Rrumbullaku
 Mateus Shkreta
 Foto Strakosha
 Mihal Thano
 Pavli Vangjeli
 Emiljano Vila
 Arjan Xhumba
Algeria
 Salim Arrache
 Ismaël Bouzid
 Riad Hammadou
 Karim Soltani
Armenia
 Murat Seropian
Argentina
 Óscar Álvarez +
 Leandro Becerra
 Fabricio Brener
 Esteban Buján
 Claudio Campos
 Cristian Chávez
 Héctor Cuevas
 Tomas De Vincenti
 Rodrigo Erramuspe
 Pitu García
 Roberto Gargini
 Alfredo Glasman
 Eduardos Kontogeorgakis
 Eduardo Lisa
 Juan Montes
 Jose Pasternac
 Lucas Rimoldi
 Jonathan Joel Rodríguez
 Fernando Sanjurjo
 Luis Sarmiento
 Lucas Scaglia
 Diego Moros Sosa
Australia
 Apostolos Stamatelopoulos
Belgium
 Patrick Dimbala
 Marvin Peersman
Benin
 Félicien Singbo
Bosnia-Herzegovina
 Samir Duro
 Miodrag Medan
 Samir Radovac
Brazil
 Mauro César
 Bruno Chalkiadakis
 Élder
 Cleber Tadeu Faustino
 Jairo
 Luciano
 Luiz Carlos
 Leandro Pinto
 Rogério Oliveira
 Fillip Rodrigues
 Vanderson
 Higor Vidal
Bulgaria
 Nikola Velkov
 Georgios Manthatis
 Yasin Mishaui
 Georgi Sheytanov
 Hristo Telkiyski
Cameroon
 Guy Armand Feutchine
 Serge Honi
 Imandi Ndieng
 Franck Songo'o
Canada
 Nikolaos Georgiadis
Chile
 Mario Cáceres
 Francisco Ugarte
Colombia
 Fabry Castro
 Juan José Perea
 Kevin Rosero
Croatia
 Sandi Križman
 Ivica Majstorović
 Lukas Poklepović
Cyprus
 Andreas Melanarkitis
 Neofytos Michael
DR Congo
 Markos Maragoudakis
France
 Franck Betra
 Derek Decamps
 Jean-Baptiste Léo
 Christopher Maboulou
 Jérôme Prior
 Fabrice Reuperné
Georgia
 Lasha Jakobia
 Vakhtang Khvadagiani
 Levan Kebadze
 Georgi Koridze
 Mikheil Khutsishvili
 Vakhtang Khvadagiani
 Lasha Shergelashvili
Germany
 Dimitrios Ferfelis
 Michael Gardawski
 Georgios Gougoulias
 Alexandros Kartalis
 Giannis Kiakos
 Jan-Marc Schneider
 Alexis Triadis
 Panagiotis Triadis

Greece
 Georgios Abaris
 Dionysis Alexakis
 Paraskevas Andralas
 Alexis Apostolopoulos
 Stefanos Athanasiadis
 Vasilis Athanasiou
 Michalis Avgenikou
 Nikos Babaniotis
 Sotiris Balafas
 Petros Bagalianis
 Gerasimos Bakadimas
 Sotiris Balafas
 Theodoros Berios
 Andreas Bonovas
 Christos Bourbos
 Michalis Boukouvalas
 Thanasis Bretanos
 Charis Charisis
 Lefteris Choutesiotis
 Georgios Dasios
 Christos Donis
 Georgios Donis
 Georgios Doumtsis
 Christos Eleftheriadis
 Dimitrios Eleftheropoulos
 Stefanos Evangelou
 Iraklis Garoufalias
 Nikolaos Georgeas
 Fotis Georgiou
 Evripidis Giakos
 Makis Giannikoglou
 Andreas Gianniotis
 Theodoros Gitkos
 Xenofon Gittas
 Georgios Gogos
 Takis Grammeniatis
 Antonis Ikonomopoulos
 Antonis Iliadis
 Petros Kanakoudis
 Alexandros Kalogeris
 Vangelis Kaounos
 Zisis Karachalios
 Dimitrios Karagiannis
 Nikos Karanikas
 Giannis Kargas
 Konstantinos Kaznaferis
 Kostas Kiassos
 Fotis Kipouros
 Dimitrios Kolovetsios
 Alexandros Kontos
 Evangelos Kontogoulidis
 Nikos Korovesis
 Ilias Kotsios
 Georgios Kousas
 Christos Koutsospyros
 Leonardo Koutris
 Chrysovalantis Kozoronis
 Tasos Kritikos
 Thomas Kyparissis
 Anastasios Kyriakos
 Nikos Lappas
 Nikos Liakos
 Manolis Liapakis
 Angelos Liasos
 Alexandros Lolis
 Giannis Loukinas
 Michalis Manias
 Alexandros Masouras
 Konstantinos Mavropanos
 Kostas Mendrinos
 Alexios Michail
 Ilias Michalopoulos
 Giannis Mystakidis
 Giannis Nakos
 Georgios Niklitsiotis
 Alexandros Nikolias
 Sotiris Ninis
 Sokratis Ofrydopoulos
 Giorgos Oikonomou
 Marios Oikonomou
 Kostas Pagonis
 Pantelis Panourgias
 Anastasios Pantos
 Epaminondas Pantelakis
 Vasilis Papachristou
 Vasilis Papagelis
 Alekos Papageorgiou 
 Lakis Papaioannou
 Alexandros Paschalakis
 Christos Patsatzoglou
 Kostas Peristeridis
 Stavros Pilios
 Giorgos Priskas 
 Giannis Rizos
 Vasilios Rovas
 Manolis Saliakas
 Georgios Saitiotis
 Stamatis Sapalidis
 Giourkas Seitaridis
 Dimitris Sialmas
 Georgios Sikalias
 Stefanos Siontis
 Apostolos Skondras
 Manolis Skoufalis
 Ilias Solakis
 Dimitrios Sotiriou
 Vasilios Soulis
 Nikos Spyropoulos
 Giannis Stathis
 Charalambos Tabasis
 Giannis Tatsis
 Angelos Tsavos
 Panagiotis Tsintotas
 Stavros Tsoukalas
 Thomas Tsourlidas
 Christos Tzanis
 Panagiotis Tzimas
 Lampros Vangelis
 Markos Vellidis
 Georgios Xydas
 Nikolaos Zafiropoulos
 Nikos Zapropoulos
 Giannis Zaradoukas
 Vasilios Zogos
 Petros Zouroudis
Guatemala
 Guillermo Ramírez
 Carlos Ruiz

Guinea
 Ahmad Mendes Moreira
 Jean Marie Sylla
Hungary
 Georgios Ananiadis
 Attila Polgár
 Tibor Szabó
Ivory Coast
 Ibrahima Bakayoko
 Alain Behi
 Gilles Domoraud
 Manssour Fofana
Jamaica
 James Serchwell
Kazakhstan
 Leonidas Kyvelidis
Liberia
 Joe Nagbe 
Mali
 Mamadou Bagayoko
 Mahamadou Sidibé
North Macedonia
 Dragan Bočeski
 Mite Cikarski
 Jane Gavalovski
 Vlatko Gošev
 Sandro Manevski
 Stojanče Zlatanovski
Moldova
 Nicolae Milinceanu
Morocco
 Karim Fegrouche
 Jaouad Zairi
Netherlands
 Dennis van Wijk
 Daan Rienstra
 Charlton Vicento
New Zealand
 Themistoklis Tzimopoulos
Paraguay
 Ronald Huth
 David Meza
Poland
 Louis Poznański
Portugal
 José Emílio Furtado
Romania
 Claudiu Bălan
 Aurelian Chițu
 Andrei Radu
Russia
 Yuri Lodygin
Senegal
 Paul Keita
Serbia
 Enes Dolovać
 Milan Đurđević
 Brana Ilić
 Dragan Kokotović
 Dejan Miljanić
 Vladan Milojević
 Zdenko Muf
 Dušan Pantelić
 Dragan Radisić
 Dragojlo Radojičić
 Dejan Sarić
 Željko Simović
 Dusan Vidojević
Slovakia
 Erik Kržišnik
 Martin Urban
Slovenia
 Erik Kržišnik
 Mirnes Šišić
 Andraž Struna
Spain
 Ibón Arrieta
 Noé Acosta
 Iker Bilbao
 Pedro Pérez Conde
 Juan Domínguez
 David López Nadales
 Carles Soria
Sweden
 Kemajl Avdiu
 Njogu Demba-Nyrén
 Philip Hellquist
Switzerland
 Fabrizio Zambrella
Togo
 Paul Adado
Uganda
 Alex Kakuba
Ukraine
 Orest Kuzyk
 Vladyslav Naumets
United States
 Caleb Stanko
Uruguay
 Mario Barcelo
 Gerónimo Bortagaray
 Vicente Estavillo
 Federico Gino
 Marcelo Lipatín
 Nicolás Schenone
Venezuela
 César Castro
 Ricardo David Páez
Zimbabwe
 Kennedy Nagoli
|-
|}

Managerial history
Further information:PAS Giannina F.C. managers

Further information:List of PAS Giannina F.C. managers

 Kostas Choumis (1966)
 Konstantinos Kokkas (1966) Care taker
 Adam Pitsioudis (1966–67)
 Christoforidis (1967–68)
 Chrisochoou (1968–69)
 Karalazos (1969–)
 Panagiotis Deligiorgis (–70)
 Adam Pitsioudis (1970–)
 Giannis Papantoniou (–71)
 Gómez de Faria (1971–73)
 Nikos Alefantos (1973–74)
 Eduardo Rigani (1974)
 Antonis Georgiadis (1974–76)
 Dobromir Zhechev (1976–77)
 Antonis Georgiadis (1977–79)
 Nikos Alefantos (1979)
 Paulos Tzamakos (1979)
 Giorgos Siontis (1979)
 Jacek Gmoch (December, 1979 – June 30, 1981)
 Giorgos Siontis (1981–1982)
 Petar Argirov (1982–1983)
 Andreas Karamanolakis (1983–84)
 Gerhard Prokop (1984)
 Giorgos Siontis (1984)
 Christos Archontidis (July 1, 1984 – June 30, 1985)
 Gerhard Prokop (July 1, 1985 – Dec 29, 1986)
 Takis Geitonas (Dec 30, 1986 – Jan 7,1987) Care taker
 Ab Fafié (Jan 7, 1987 – June 30, 1987)
 Kostas Karapatis (Aug 11, - Nov 24, 1987)
 Thomas Tsourlidas (Nov 24, 1987 – Dec 27, 1987)
 Stefanos Vasileiadis (Dec 27, 1987 – 88)
 Giorgos Siontis (1988)
 Thanasis Loukanidis-Takis Loukanidis (1988–89)
 Alfredo Glasmanis-Paulos Tzamakos (1989)
 Stavros Diamantopoulos (July 1, 1989 – April 23, 1990)
 Thanasis Dimitriadis (April 24, 1990 – June 8, 1990)
 Włodzimierz Lubański (June 9, 1990 – July 6, 1990)
 Tom Frivalski (July 6, 1990 – Sep 6, 1990)
 Stefanos Vasileiadis (Sep 6, 1990 – Sep 14, 1990) Care taker
 Petr Packert (Sep 14, 1990 – June 2, 1991)
 Barry Hulshoff (July 1, 1991 – Dec 5, 1991)
 Stefanos Vasileiadis (Dec 5, 1991 – Dec 13, 1991) Care taker
 Giorgos Siontis (Dec 13, 1991 – Jan 20, 1992)
 Thanasis Dimitriadis (Jan 24, 1992 – June 30, 1992)
 Anthimos Kapsis (July 1, 1992 – Jan 24, 1993)
 Lazaros Giotis (Jan 25, 1993 – June 30, 1993)
 Dragan Kokotović (July 1, 1993 – February 19, 1994)
 Nikos Kirgios (Feb 19, 1994 – Feb 25, 1994) Care taker
 Makis Katsavakis (February 25, 1994 – April 11, 1994)
 Vasilis Konstantinou (April 13, 1994 – June 30, 1994)
 Dobromir Zhechev (July 1, 1994 – August 1, 1994)
 Takis Grammeniatis (Aug 1, 1994 – Jan 7, 1995)
 Dimitris Seitaridis (Aug 1, 1994 – Sep 14, 1994) with Grammeniatis
 Vasilis Papachristou (Jan 10, 1995 – June 30, 1995)
 Timo Zahnleiter (July 1, 1995 – January 10, 1996)
 Dimitris Seitaridis (Jan 10, 1996 – Sep 27, 1996)
 Thanasis Dimitriadis (Sep 27, 1996 – Mar 12, 1997)
 Vasilis Papachristou (Mar 12, 1997 – June 30, 1998)
 Makis Katsavakis (July 1, 1998 – October 29, 1998)
 Nikos Kirgios (Oct 29, 1998 – Nov 3, 1998) Care taker
 Nikos Anastopoulos (Nov 3, 1998 – May 3, 1999)
 Vasilis Papachristou (May 3, 1999 – June 30, 1999)
 Andreas Michalopoulos (July 1, 1999 – Feb 15, 2000)
 Giorgos Foiros (February 15, 2000 – June 30, 2000)
 Georgios Paraschos (July 1, 2000 – Jan 11, 2001)
 Andreas Bonovas (Jan 11, 2001 – Jan 13, 2001) Care taker
 Nikos Kovis (Jan 13, 2001 – Jan 29, 2001)
 Nikos Anastopoulos (Jan 29, 2001 – June 30, 2001)
 Stavros Mentis (July 1, 2001 – Aug 20, 2001)
 Horacio Cordero (Aug 20, 2001 – Sep 23, 2001)
 Giorgos Foiros (September 24, 2001 – May 22, 2002)
 Giorgos Vazakas (June 1, 2002 – June 7, 2002)
 Vasilis Papachristou (July 1, 2002 – Nov 5, 2002)
 Nikos Anastopoulos (Nov 8, 2002 – June 30, 2003)
 Pantelis Kolokas (July 1, 2003 – Aug 7, 2003) Care taker
 Bo Petersson (Aug 7, 2003 – Jan 12, 2004)
 Sotiris Zavogiannis (Jan 12, 2004 – Jan 15, 2004) Care taker
 Jemal Gugushvili (Jan 15, 2004 – April 1, 2004)
 Goderdzi Natroshvili (Feb 11, 2004 – April 1, 2004)
 Pantelis Kolokas (April 1, 2004 – April 18, 2004) Care taker
 Thanasis Charisis (April 22, 2004 – June 30, 2004)
 Zoran Smileski (July 1, 2004 – Feb 21, 2005)
 Giorgos Ladias (Feb 21, 2005 – Feb 23, 2005) Care taker
 Petros Michos (Feb,23 2005 – April 10, 2005)
 Giorgos Ladias (April 10, 2005 – June 30, 2005)
 Vasilis Xanthopoulos (July 1, 2005 – Oct 26, 2005)
 Giorgos Ladias (Oct 26, 2005 – Jan 11, 2006)
 Ioannis Gounaris (Jan 12, 2006 – Aug 3, 2006)
 Nikos Anastopoulos (Aug 5, 2006 – Jan 15, 2007)
 Giannis Papakostas (Jan 15, 2007 – June 30, 2007)
 Georgios Chatzaras (July 1, 2007 – March 2, 2008)
 Periklis Amanatidis (March 3, 2008 – May 28, 2008)
 Thanasis Charisis (May 28, 2008 – 30 June 2008) Care Taker
 Nikos Anastopoulos (June 23, 2008 – June 30, 2008)
 Guillermo Ángel Hoyos (July 1, 2008 – April 29, 2009)
 Miltos Mastoras (April 29, 2009 – May 25, 2009) Care Taker
 Georgios Paraschos (July 1, 2009 – Dec 7, 2009)
 Thimios Georgoulis (Dec 7, 2009 – Jan 13,2010) Care taker
 Nikos Anastopoulos (Jan 14, 2010 – June 30, 2010)
 Stéphane Demol (July 1, 2010 – Nov 23, 2011)
 Giannis Christopoulos (Nov 23, 2011 – Dec 4, 2011) Care taker
 Angelos Anastasiadis (Dec 4, 2011 – June 8, 2012)
 Giannis Christopoulos (June 8, 2012 – June 16, 2013)
 Savvas Pantelidis (June 24, 2013 – Oct 31, 2013)
 Giorgos Georgoulopoulos (Oct 31, 2013 – Nov 5, 2013) Care taker
 Sakis Tsiolis (Nov 5, 2013 – Jan 22, 2014)
 Giorgos Georgoulopoulos (Jan 22, 2014 – Jan 28, 2014) Care taker
 Giannis Petrakis (Jan 28, 2014 – May 8, 2019)
 Argirios Giannikis (Jun 8, 2019 – May 19, 2021)
 Iraklis Metaxas (Jun 3, 2021 – Jun 7, 2022)
 Athanasios Staikos (Jun 7, 2022 – Present)

Club personnel

 Technical staff 

Coaching staff

 Medical staff 

Club personnel

 Former presidents 

Sponsorships
Great Shirt Sponsor: NetBetOfficial Sport Clothing Manufacturer: Le Coq SportifGolden Sponsor: TBASee also
PAS Giannina (sports club)

References

External linksOfficial websitesOfficial website 
PAS Giannina at Super League 
PAS Giannina at UEFANews sitesPAS Giannina on pas.gr 
PAS Giannina news from Nova SportsOtherPAS Giannina Shop
PAS Giannina club anthem
Forum of PAS Giannina fans
Blue Vayeros PAS Giannina fans
Apei Rotan PAS Giannina fans
Blue Vayeros Thessaloniki PAS Giannina fans
Zosimades stadium
Panipeirotiko stadiumMedia'
Facebook
Instagram
Twitter
YouTube

 
Association football clubs established in 1966
Ioannina
Football clubs in Epirus
Football clubs in Greece
Multi-sport clubs in Greece
1966 establishments in Greece